Anderson Mesa (Navajo: Hosh Dikʼání) is approximately five mesas long, located 20 miles southeast of Flagstaff, Arizona, United States, east of Lake Mary and north of Mormon Lake, in Coconino County.

Because it is also very flat, it is also home to the Naval Observatory's Navy Precision Optical Interferometer, or "NPOI", since 1992.

It is also the inspiration for the 1996 Jimmy Eat World song of the same title.

See also
 Table (landform)

References

External links
  – 

Mesas of Arizona
Landforms of Coconino County, Arizona